Dinosaurs for Hire is an American comic book series created by Tom Mason in 1988. It was first published by Eternity Comics and ran nine issues until 1990 when it was cancelled. The title returned to publication in 1993 by Malibu Comics, which had purchased Eternity as an imprint.

Dinosaurs For Hire, along with Ex-Mutants, was merged with the Protectors universe during Malibu's Genesis crossover before being cancelled a second time. Malibu was purchased by Marvel Comics in 1993, and no Dinosaurs for Hire comics have been published since. Within the Marvel Comics multiverse, the Dinosaurs for Hire reality is designated as Earth-88469.

Dinosaurs for Hire originated as a black-and-white comic by Mason titled Elvis Undercover, featuring Elvis Presley as a crime-fighter. The comic was never produced, out of concerns that Presley's estate would sue. Mason eventually divided Presley's fictional personality among three dinosaur characters, resulting in Dinosaurs for Hire. To represent the dinosaur characters, Mason chose Tyrannosaurus, Triceratops, and Stegosaurus, based on their popularity among the general public.

Synopsis
Dinosaurs for Hire is a satirical comic that is heavy on parody and humor. The primary characters are a tyrannosaurus named Archie who dresses like the Terminator, a triceratops named Lorenzo who wears a Hawaiian shirt, a one-eyed stegosaurus named Reese who wields heavy weapons, and a pterodactyl named Cyrano. In the comics, the Dinosaurs are actually intelligent aliens who resemble smaller versions of Earth dinosaurs presumably due to a convergent evolution (aside from their extraterrestrial nature, their backstory was only hinted at but never confirmed). After their spacecraft malfunctions in Earth's atmosphere and crashes into the ocean, they are stranded on Earth and become mercenaries for hire.

In other media

Video game

A Dinosaurs for Hire video game by Sega was released in 1993, for the Sega Genesis. It is a shoot 'em up game featuring Archie, Lorenzo and Reese as playable characters, while Cyrano occasionally shows up to give mission briefings.

Cancelled animated series 
An animated television series had been planned for the Fox Network in the early 1990s, with Mason as a consultant. The project was stagnant for two years, until Fox took notice of the upcoming dinosaur film Jurassic Park (1993). According to Mason, there was suddenly "a tremendous rush to get a dinosaur show on the air". Comic book writer Len Wein was hired to work on the series bible and pilot episode script.

Mason was not fond of Fox's planned direction for the series. He said the network wanted a series similar to Teenage Mutant Ninja Turtles with "lots of slapstick hijinks". According to Mason, Fox sought to "dumb down" the Dinosaurs for Hire concept and make it "kid-friendly for TV". The network also wanted the series to reveal the dinosaurs' origins, an idea that Mason disliked, believing it would take away "a certain amount of mystery and charm". He had devised his own origin story years earlier but did not wish to reveal it, stating only that it was much different to what Fox had planned. He said Fox's origin story would not be acknowledged in his comics. The show never made it out of development.

References

External links
Unofficial Profile of Revenue,  at Marvunapp.com

1988 comics debuts
1990 comics endings
1993 comics debuts
1994 comics endings
Dinosaurs in comic books
Eternity Comics titles
Comics adapted into video games
Comics about extraterrestrial life
Fictional mercenaries in comics